On June 28, 1880, a boiler aboard the steamboat Seawanhaka exploded while the boat was in the East River near Wards Island, New York City, setting the boat on fire and resulting in the deaths of 24 to 35 people. A coroner's jury found that although the boiler had passed inspection the prior March and should have been in good working condition, the loss of life was exacerbated by the poor discipline of the boat crew following the explosion.

References

1880 disasters in the United States
History of New York City
Maritime incidents in the United States
Maritime incidents in 1880
Transportation accidents in New York City
June 1880 events
1880 in New York City